This is a partial List of historical and heritage societies from around the world. The sections provided are not mutually exclusive. Many historical societies websites are their museums' websites. List is organized by location and later by specialization.

International societies

Global
Comité International d'Histoire de l'Art
Haitian American Historical Society
Historians without Borders
History News Network
International Association for Media and History
International Committee of Historical Sciences
International Commission for the History of Towns
International Council on Archives
International Historical Club, IHC
International Economic History Association
International Social History Association
International Association for the History of Religions
International Intelligence History Association
International Water History Association
International Students of History Association
International Big History Association
Medieval Chronicle Society
Network of Concerned Historians
The Theosophical Society

Supra-national
Archives and Records Association (covers United Kingdom and Republic of Ireland)
Asian Association of World Historians
European Association of History Educators (EUROCLIO)
Global Alliance for Preserving the History of WWII in Asia
House of European History
International Association of Historians of Asia
Platform of European Memory and Conscience
Western History Association
World History Association

Australian societies

National societies
The Australian Historical Association
Federation of Australian Historical Societies
Australian Jewish Historical Society
Australian Association for Maritime History
Australian Catholic Historical Society
Australian Railway Historical Society
Naval Historical Society of Australia
Australian Garden History Society
Military Historical Society of Australia

State and territory societies

New South Wales
Royal Australian Historical Society
St George Historical Society, St George (Sydney)

Northern Territory
Historical Society of the Northern Territory

Queensland
Royal Historical Society of Queensland

South Australia 
Kangaroo Island Pioneers Association
South Australia Police Historical Society

Tasmania
Tasmanian Historical Research Association

Victoria
Royal Historical Society of Victoria
Eltham District Historical Society
Geelong Historical Society
Heidelberg Historical Society

Western Australia
The Royal Western Australian Historical Society is the overarching society for the whole state.

Perth:
Heritage Perth
Bassendean Historical Society
Bayswater Historical Society
Canning Districts Historical Society 
City of South Perth Historical Society
Cockburn Historical Society 
Colonial Bottle Collectors Club 
Darlington Historical Group
Fremantle History Society
Jewish Historical and Genealogical Society of WA 
Kalamunda and Districts Historical Society 
Maritime Archaeological Association WA 
Maylands Historical and Peninsula Association 
Melville Historical Society
Midland and Districts Historical Society 
Mundaring and Hills Historical Society
Perth Electric Tramway Society 
Rockingham District Society 
Scout Heritage Centre of WA 
Swan-Guildford Historical Society 
WA Police Historical Society 
Wanneroo and Districts Historical Society

Peel:
Jarrahdale Heritage Society 
Kwinana Heritage Group 
Mandurah Historical Society 
Murray Districts Historical Society 
Serpentine Historical Society

Wheatbelt:
Beverley Historical Society 
Bindoon and Districts Historical Society 
Brookton and Districts Historical Society 
Carnamah Historical Society
Cervantes Historical Society 
Corrigin Historical Society 
Cunderdin Historical Society 
Goomalling Historical Society 
Koorda and Districts Museum & Historical Society 
Moora Historical Society 
Narembeen Historical Society 
Northam and Districts Historical Society 
Nungarin Heritage Machinery and Army Museum 
Toodyay Historical Society
Wongan Hills and Districts Museum and Historical Society 
Yilgarn Historical Society 
The York Society

South West:
Augusta Historical Society
Australind and Districts Historical Society 
Bridgetown Historical Society 
Bunbury Historical Society 
Busselton Historical Society 
Denmark Historical Society 
Donnybrook Historical Society 
Friends of Donnelly Village 
Harvey Historical Society 
Manjimup Historical Society 
Margaret River and District Historical Society 
Walpole-Nornalup Historical Society

Great Southern:
Albany Historical Society
Broomehill Historical Society 
Katanning Historical Society 
Kojonup Historical Society 
Plantagenet Historical Society

Mid West:
Birdwood Military Museum and Society 
Geraldton Historical Society 
Irwin Districts Historical Society 
Morowa District Historical Society 
Northampton Historical Society

Kimberley:
Broome Historical Society 
Kununurra Historical Society 
Wyndham Historical Society

Goldfields-Esperance:
Eastern Goldfields Historical Society 
Esperance Bay Historical Society 
Ravensthorpe Historical Society

Gascoyne:
Gascoyne Historical Society

Pilbara:
Pilbara Railways Historical Society

Brazil Societies 

 Associação Nacional de História (ANPUH)

Canada societies

National societies 
Canadian Historical Association

Provincial and territorial societies
Manitoba Historical Society
Royal Nova Scotia Historical Society
Ontario Historical Society
Literary and Historical Society of Quebec

New Brunswick 
New Brunswick Historical Society
Carleton County Historical Society

Newfoundland and Labrador
Greenspond Historical Society

Ontario
York Pioneers

Alberta
Old Glenora Conservation Association

Saskatchewan 
Prince Albert Historical Society

China
Association of Chinese Historians

Czech Republic 
Český národní komitét historiků

Germany 
Verband der Historiker und Historikerinnen Deutschlands

Ghana 
Historical Society of Ghana

Hungary 
Hungarian Historical Society

Ireland

Royal Society of Antiquaries of Ireland
Galway Archaeological and Historical Society
Irish Historical Society
Kilkenny Archaeological Society
Ards Historical Society, in Newtownards

Lithuania societies 
Lithuanian Institute of History

Mexico 
Academia Mexicana de la Historia, National Academy

Moldova 

 Association of Historians of Moldova

Morocco 
Association Marocaine pour La Recherche Historique

Netherlands 
Koninklijk Nederlands Historisch Genootschap

New Zealand 
The New Zealand Historical Association

Pakistan 
 Pakistan Museum of Natural History

Poland 
Polish Historical Society (Poland)

Portugal 
Academia Portuguesa da Historia

Saudi Arabia 
Historical Saudi Historical Society

South Africa 
 Southern African Historical Society

Philippines societies 
Philippine Historical Association

Turkey societies 
Turkish Historical Society

United Kingdom and Crown dependencies societies

National societies 
Anglo-Norman Text Society
Black and Asian Studies Association
British Record Society
British Records Association
Canterbury and York Society
Catholic Record Society
Crimean War Research Society
Hadrianic Society
Harleian Society
Honourable Society of Cymmrodorion (Wales)
List and Index Society
Naval Dockyards Society (NDS)
Navy Records Society
Past and Present Society
Royal Historical Society
Scottish History Society
Scottish Record Society
Selden Society (English law)
Society for Army Historical Research
Society of Antiquaries of London
Society of Antiquaries of Scotland
Stair Society (Scots law)
The Historical Association

Regional and local societies

United States societies

National societies
American Antiquarian Society
American Historical Association
American Baptist Historical Society
Jewish American Society for Historic Preservation
National Historical Society
Order of the Founders and Patriots of America
Organization of American Historians
Society of American Historians
Shapell Manuscript Foundation

State societies

Territorial societies 
Official Historian of Puerto Rico

Federal District societies
Historical Society of Washington, D.C.
Supreme Court Historical Society

County and local societies

California
Carmel Valley Historical Society
Contra Costa County Historical Society
Historical Society of Southern California
Lemon Grove Historical Society
Orange County Historical Society
Pasadena Historical Society
San Diego Historical Society
 Sonoma County Historical Society
Western Sonoma County Historical Society

Colorado

Connecticut

Delaware
Georgetown Historical Society
Laurel Historical Society
Lewes Historical Society
Seaford Historical Society

Florida

Georgia 
Athens Clarke Heritage Foundation
Atlanta Historical Society
Fayette County Historical Society
Roswell Historical Society

Idaho 
Clearwater Historical Society, Orofino

Illinois 
Bureau County Historical Society
Hamilton County Historical Society
Libertyville-Mundelein Historical Society

Indiana 

Abington Historical Society
Adams County Historical Society
Alexandria-Monroe Township Historical Society
Allen County-Fort Wayne Historical Society
Anson Wolcott Historical Society
Antiquarian and Historical Society of Culver
Balbec Historical Club
Bartholomew County Historical Society
Batesville Area Historical Society
Beech Grove Historical Society
Benton County Historical Society
Besancon Historical Society
Beverly Shores Historical Society
Blackford County Historical Society
Boone County Historical Society
Borden Institute Historical Society
Brown County Historical Society
Canal Society of Indiana
Carmel Clay Historical Society
Carroll County Historical Society
Cass County Historical Society
Christian Park Active Community
Clark's Grant Historical Society
Clarksville Historical Society
Clay County Historical Society
Clay Township Historical & Preservation Society
Clinton County Historical Society
Crawford County Historical and Genealogical Society
Daviess County Historical Society
Dearborn County Historical Society
Decatur Township Historical Society
DeKalb County Historical Society
Delaware County Historical Society
Demotte Historical Society
Dubois County Historical Society
Duneland Historical Society
Dyer Historical Society
East Chicago Historical Society
Elkhart County Historical Society
Elwood-Pipecreek Historical Society
Ferdinand Historical Society
Floyd County Historical Society
Fort Wayne Railroad Historical Society
Fountain County Historical Society
Franklin County Historical Society
Franklin Township Historical Society
Fremont Historical Society
Fulton County Historical Society
Garrett Historical Society
Gary Historical & Cultural Society
Gas City Historical Society
Gibson County Historical Society
Grabill Historical Society
Grant County Historical Society
Greene County Historical Society
Greentown Historical Society
Griffith Historical Society
Haley Tower Historical & Technical Society
Hamilton County Historical Society
Hammond Historical Society
Hancock County Historical Society
Hanna Historical Society
Haubstadt Area Historical Society
Hebron Historical Society
Henry County Historical Society
Hessville Historical Society
Highland Historical Society
Historical Society of Decatur County
Historical Society of Harrison County
Historical Society of Ogden Dunes
Historical Society of Porter County
Hobart Historical Society
Howard County Historical Society
Huntertown Historical Society
Huntington County Historical Society
Indiana German Heritage Society
Indiana High School Basketball Historical Society
Indiana Historical Radio Society
Indiana Jewish Historical Society
Indiana Postal History Society
Indianapolis Firefighters Historical Society
Ireland Historical Society
Irvington Historical Society
Jackson Township Historical Society
Jasper County Historical Society
Jay County Historical Society
Jefferson County Historical Society
Jennings County Historical Society
Johnson County Historical Society
Jonesboro Historical Society
Joseph Boggs Society for Historic Preservation
Kankakee Valley Historical Society
Kendallville Historical Society
Kennard Historical Society
Kosciusko County Historical Society
La Porte County Historical Society
LaGrange County Historical Society
Lake County Historical Society
Lake Station Historical Society
Lawrence County Railroad Historical Society
Lexington Historical Society (Indiana)
Liberty Township Historical Society
Ligonier Historical Society
Linden-Madison Township Historical Society
Long Beach Historical Society
Madison County Historical Society
Marion County Historical Society (Indiana)
Marshall County Historical Society
Martin County Historical Society
Matthews Covered Bridge Historical Society
Merrillville-Ross Township Historical Society
Miami County Historical Society
Michiana Jewish Historical Society
Michigan City Historical Society
Middletown Fall Creek Township Historical Society
Mississinewa Battlefield Society
Monon Railroad Historical–Technical Society, Inc.
Monroeville Historical Society
Montgomery County Historical Society (Indiana)
Montpelier Historical Society
Morgan County History and Genealogy Association
Munster Historical Society
New Paris Historical Society
Newton County Historical Society
Noble County Historical Society
North Manchester Center for History
Ohio County Historical Society
Orange County Historical Society (Orange County, Indiana)
Orestes Historical Society
Osceola Historical Society
Owen County Historical and Genealogical Society
Parke County Historical Society
Pekin Historical Society
Perry Township Pioneer Cemetery Society
Perry Township-Southport Historical Society
Pike Township Historical Society
Portage Community Historical Society
Posey County Historical Society
Pulaski County Historical Society
Putnam County Historical Society
Randolph County Historical and Genealogical Society
Remington Historical Society
Ripley County Historical Society
Russiaville Historical Society
Schererville Historical Society
Scotland Historical Society
Scott County Historical Society
Shelby Township Historical Association
Sheridan Historical Society
Shipshewana Area Historical Society
Shirley Historical Society
Society of Indiana Pioneers
South Lake County Agricultural Historical Society
Southwestern Indiana Historical Society
Spencer County Historical Society
St. John Historical Society
Starke County Historical Society
Steuben County Historical Society
Sugar Creek Historical Society
Sullivan County Historical Society
Summitville Van Buren Township Historical Society
Surveyors Historical Society
Switzerland County Historical Society
Tell City Historical Society
The Wanatah Historical Society
Three Creeks Historical Association
Tippecanoe County Historical Association
Tipton County Historical Society
Topeka Area Historical Society
Union County Historical Society
Upland Area Historical Society
Vanderburgh County Historical Society
Vermillion County Historical Society
Vigo County Historical Society
Vincennes Historical and Antiquarian Society
Wabash County Historical Society
Wakarusa Historical Society
Walkerton Area Historical Society
Warren County Historical Society
Washington County Historical Society (Indiana)
Wayne Township Historical Society
Wells County Historical Society
West Baden Historical Society
Westfield-Washington Historical Society
Westville Community Historical Society
White County Historical Society
Whiting-Robertsdale Historical Society
Whitley County Historical Society
Yorktown Mt. Pleasant Township Historical Alliance
Zionsville Historical Society

Iowa 
Cedar Falls Historical Society
Massena Historical Society
Johnson County Historical Society

Kansas 
Clearwater Historical Society

Kentucky 
Filson Historical Society
Kentucky Genealogical Society

Louisiana 
North Louisiana Historical Association
Preservation Resource Center of New Orleans
The Historic New Orleans Collection

Maine 
 Clinton Historical Society (Maine)
 Pejepscot Historical Society, Brunswick, Topsham & Harpswell history
 Scarborough Historical Society (Maine)

Maryland 
Allegany County Historical Society
Allen Historical Society
Ann Arrundell County Historical Society
Calvert County Historical Society
Caroline County Historical Society
Dorchester County Historical Society
Montgomery County Historical Society
Historical Society of Baltimore County
Historical Society of Carroll County
Historical Society of Cecil County
Historical Society of Charles County
Historical Society of Frederick County
Historical Society of Harford County
Historical Society of Kent County
Historical Society of Talbot County
St. Mary's County Historical Society
Wicomico Historical Society

Massachusetts 

Berkshire County
Adams Historical Society
Great Barrington Historical Society and Museum

Bristol County
Acushnet Historical Society
Fall River Historical Society
Old Colony Historical Society

Essex County
Beverly Historical Society
Essex Institute (active 1848-1992)
Ipswich Historical Society

Franklin County
Historical Society of Greenfield
Swift River Historical Society

Hampden County
Agawam Historical Association
Chicopee Historical Society

Hampshire County
Amherst Historical Society
Historic Northampton

Middlesex County
Acton Historical Society
Arlington Historical Society
Chelmsford Historical Society
Groton Historical Society
Lexington Historical Society
Marlborough Historical Society

Norfolk County
Dedham Historical Society and Museum
Quincy Historical Society
Sharon Historical Society

Plymouth County
Alden Kindred of America
Duxbury Rural and Historical Society
Hanson Historical Society
Historical Society of Old Abington
Middleborough Historical Association
Old Bridgewater Historical Society
Plymouth Antiquarian Society

Suffolk County
The Bostonian Society
Brighton-Allston Historical Society & Heritage Museum
Dorchester Historical Society
The Historical Society, Boston University (active 1998-2014)
Hyde Park Historical Society
Jamaica Plain Historical Society
North End Historical Society
Roslindale Historical Society
Roxbury Historical Society
South End Historical Society
West End Museum

Worcester County, Massachusetts
Clinton Historical Society
Fitchburg Historical Society
Harvard Historical Society

Michigan

Ada Historical Society
Albion Historical Society
Alcona Historical Society
Alfred Noble Historical Society
Alger County Historical Society
Algoma Township Historical Society
Algonac-Clay Township Historical Society
Allegan County Historical Society
Allendale Historical Society
Almira Historical Society
Aloha Historical Society
Arcadia Area Historical Society
Arenac County Historical Society
Arvon Township Historical Society
Athens Area Historical Society
Bad Axe Historical Society
Bangor Historical Society
Baraga County Historical Society
Barry County Historical Society
Bay County Historical Society
Bean Creek Valley Historical Society
Beaver Island Historical Society
Bedford Historical Society
Beechwood Historical Society
Bellaire Area Historical Society
Bellevue Area Historical Society
Benzie Area Historical Society
Benzie Area Historical Society
Bernard Historical Society
Bessemer Area Historical Society
Bloomfield Historical Society
Bois Blanc Island Historical Society
Boston-Saranac Historical Society
Branch County Historical Society
Breckenridge-Wheeler Area Historical Society
Brighton Area Historical Society
Byron Center Historical Society
Cannon Township Historical Society
Canton Historical Society
Capac Community Historical Society
Cascade Historical Society
Cedar Springs Historical Society
Central Lake Area Historical Society
Charlevoix Historical Society
Chelsea Area Historical Society
Chesaning Area Historical Society
Chesterfield Historical Society
Chippewa County Historical Society
Clinton County Historical Society
Columbiaville Historical Society
Community Historical Society of Colon
Coopersville Area Historical Society
Copper Range Historical Society
Crawford County Historical Society
Crystal Township Historical Society
Davison Area Historical Society
Delta County Historical Society
Detroit Historical Society
Dexter Area Historical Society
Ecorse Historical Society
Elk Rapids Area Historical Society
Elkton Area Historical Society
Engadine Historical Society
Fallasburg Historical Society
Farwell Area Historical Society
Fenton Historical Society
Ferndale Historical Society
Fife Lake Historical Society
Flat River Historical Society
Flat Rock Historical Society
Flushing Area Historical Society
Fraser Historical Society
Friends of the Plymouth Historical Society
Genesee County Historical Society
Gladwin County Historical Society
Governor John S. Barry Historical Society
Grand Ledge Area Historical Society
Grand Marais Historical Society
Grand Rapids Historical Society  
Great Lakes Shipwreck Historical Society
Greater Washington Area Historical Society
Greater West Bloomfield Historical Society
Green Oak Township Historical Society
Greenbush Historical Society
Grosse Ile Historical Society
Grosse Pointe Historical Society
Hadley Township Historical Society
Harbor Springs Area Historical Society
Harsens Island St. Clair Flats Historical Society
Historical Society of Bridgeport
Historical Society of Caseville
Historical Society of Center Line
Historical Society of Clinton
Historical Society of Greater Lansing
Historical Society of Marine City
Historical Society of Michigan
Historical Society of Saginaw County
Holland Area Historical Society
Holly Historical Society
Homer Historical Society
Howell Area Historical Society
Huron County Historical Society
Huron Township Historical Society
Inland Water Route Historical Society
Ionia County Historical Society
Iosco County Historical Society
Ironwood Area Historical Society
Isabella County Historical Society
Ishpeming Area Historical Society
Jewish Historical Society of Michigan
Kalamazoo County Historical Society
Kaleva Historical Society
Keweenaw County Historical Society
Lake County Historical Society
Lake Odessa Area Historical Society
Lapeer County Historical Society
Lathrup Village Historical Society
Leelanau Historical Society
Lenox-New Haven Historical Society
Leslie Area Historical Society
Lewiston Area Historical Society
Lincoln Park Historical Society
Lovells Township Historical Society
Luce County Historical Society
Mackinaw Area Historical Society
Macomb County Historical Society
Mancelona Historical Society
Marenisco Township Historical Society
Marilla Historical Society
Marlette Historical Society
Mason Area Historical Society
Mason County Historical Society
Mecosta County Historical Society
Menominee County Historical Society
Michigan Military Technical & Historical Society
Michilimackinac Historical Society
Midland County Historical Society
Mid-Michigan Railway Historical Society
Milan Area Historical Society
Milford Historical Society
Millersburg Area Historical Society
Millington-Arbela Historical Society
Montmorency County Historical Society
Muskegon County Historical Society
Nashville Michigan Historical Society
Negaunee Historical Society
New Baltimore Historical Society
Newton Township Historical Society
North Berrien Historical Society
Northville Historical Society
Norwegian Lutheran Church Historical Society
Norwood Area Historical Society
Oakland County Pioneer and Historical Society
Oakland Township Historical Society
Ogemaw Historical Society and Museum
Olive Township Historical Society
Omena Historical Society
Ontonagon County Historical Society
Orion Historical Society
Ortonville Community Historical Society
Oshtemo Historical Society
Otsego Area Historical Society
Otsego County Historical Society
Ovid Historical Society
Pentwater Historical Society
Pickford Area Historical Society
Pigeon Historical Society
Pittsfield Township Historical Society
Port Austin Area Historical Society
Port Huron & Detroit Railroad Historical Society
Portland Area Historical Society
Remus Area Historical Society
Republic Area Historical Society
Rochester-Avon Historical Society
Rockford Area Historical Society
Romeo Historical Society
Roscommon Area Historical Society
Rose City Area Historical Society
Royal Oak Historical Society
Saginaw Valley Railroad Historical Society
Salem Area Historical Society
Sanford Area Historical Society
Sanilac County Historical Society
Saugatuck-Douglas Historical Society
Schoolcraft County Historical Society
Sebewaing Area Historical Society
Shepherd Area Historical Society
Shiawassee County Historical Society
South Lyon Area Historical Society
Southfield Historical Society
St. Joseph County Historical Society
St. Louis Area Historical Society
Sturgis Historical Society
Sunfield Historical Society
Taylor Historical Society
Tecumseh Area Historical Society
Tekonsha Historical Society
Tompkins Center Historical Society
Traverse Area Historical Society
Troy Historical Society
Van Buren County Historical Society
Vicksburg Historical Society
Wakefield Historical Society
Wales Historical Society
Warren Historical & Genealogical Society
Washtenaw County Historical Society
Waterford Township Historical Society
Waterloo Area Historical Society
Watrousville-Caro Area Historical Society
Wayne Historical Society
Webster Township Historical Society
White Lake Historical Society
Wixom Historical Society
Ypsilanti Historical Society
Zeeland Historical Society

Minnesota 

Aitkin County
Aitkin County Historical Society
Mcgregor Area Historical Society

Anoka County
Anoka County Historical Society
Blaine Historical Society
Columbia Heights Historical Society
Coon Rapids Historical Society

Becker County
Becker County Historical Society
Lake Park Area Historical Society

Beltrami County
Beltrami County Historical Society
Blackduck Area History And Arts Center
North Beltrami Heritage Center

Benton County
Benton County Historical Society
Sartell Historical Society

Big Stone County, Minnesota
Big Stone County Historical Society

Blue Earth County
Blue Earth County Historical Society
Betsy-Tacy Society
Madison Lake Area Historical Society
Rapidan Heritage Society

Brown County
Brown County Historical Society
Comfrey Area Historical Society
Sleepy Eye Area Historical Society
Springfield Area Historical Society

Carlton County
Carlton County Historical Society
Esko Historical Society
Moose Lake Area Historical Society

Carver County
Carver County Historical Society
Chanhassen Historical Society
Chaska Historical Society
Waconia Heritage Association
Watertown Area Historical Society
Welkommen Heritage Center Of Norwood Young America

Cass County
Cass County Historical Society

Chippewa County
Chippewa County Historical Society
Maynard History Museum
Friesen Historical Society

Chisago County
Chisago County Historical Society
Amador Heritage Center
Center City Historical Society
Lindstrom Historical Society
North Chisago Historical Society
Taylors Falls Historical Society

Clay County
Historical And Cultural Society Of Clay County
Ulen Historical Society

Clearwater County
Clearwater County Historical Society
Lake Itasca Region Pioneer Farmers

Cook County
Cook County Historical Society
Gunflint Trail Historical Society
Tofte Historical Society
Schroeder Area Historical Society

Cottonwood County
Cottonwood County Historical Society

Crow Wing County
Crow Wing County Historical Society
Crosslake Area Historical Society
Cuyuna Heritage Preservation Society
Cuyuna Range Historical Society
Nisswa Area Historical Society
Pequot Lakes Area Historical Society

Dakota County
Dakota County Historical Society
Eagan Historical Society
Farmington Area Historical Society
Lakeville Area Historical Society
Rosemount Area Historical Society

Dodge County
Dodge County Historical Society
West Concord Historical Society

Douglas County
Douglas County Historical Society, Minnesota
Evansville Historical Foundation
Kensington Area Heritage Society
Osakis Area Heritage Center

Faribault County
Faribault County Historical Society
Bricelyn Area Historical Society
Elmore Area Historical Society
Kiester Area Historical Society
Minnesota Lake Area Historical Society
Wells Historical Society
Winnebago Area Museum

Fillmore County
Fillmore County History Center
Chatfield Historical Society
Harmony Area Historical Society
Hesper-Mabel Area Historical Society
Preston Historical Society
Rushford Area Historical Society
Spring Valley Community Historical Society
Wykoff Area Historical Society

Freeborn County
Freeborn County Historical Society
Community Historical Society-Alden Museum
Clarks Grove Area Heritage Society
Hollandale Area Historical Society

Goodhue County
Goodhue County History Center
Cannon Falls Area Historical Society
Goodhue Area Historical Society
Kenyon Area Historical Society
Pine Island Area Historical Society
Wanamingo Historical Society
Zumbrota Area Historical Society

Grant County
Grant County Historical Society

Hennepin County, Minnesota
Hennepin History Museum
Bloomington Historical Society
Brooklyn Historical Society
Champlin Historical Society
Eden Prairie Historical Society
Edina Historical Society
Excelsior-Lake Minnetonka Historical Society
Golden Valley Historical Society
Hopkins Historical Society
Minnetonka Historical Society
North Hennepin Historical Society
Plymouth Historical Society
Richfield Historical Society
Robbinsdale Historical Society
St. Bonifacius Historical Society
St. Louis Park Historical Society
Wayzata Historical Society
Western Hennepin County Pioneers Association
Westonka Historical Society

Houston County
Houston County Historical Society
La Crescent Area Historical Society

Hubbard County
Hubbard County Historical Society
Paul Bunyan Historical Society And Museum

Isanti County
Isanti County Historical Society

Itasca County
Itasca County Historical Society

Jackson County
Jackson County Historical Society

Kanabec County
Kanabec History Center

Kandiyohi Count
Kandiyohi County Historical Society
Norway Lake Lutheran Historical Association
Atwater Area Historical Society
Monongalia Historical Society

Kittson County
Kittson County Historical Society

Koochiching County
Koochiching County Historical Society

Lac Qui Parle County
Lac Qui Parle County Historical Society

Lake County
Lake County Historical Society
Bay Area Historical Society
Finland Minnesota Historical Society
Historical Committee Of The Isabella Community Council

Lake of the Woods County
Lake of the Woods County Historical Society

Le Sueur County
Le Sueur County Historical Society

Lincoln County
Lincoln County Historical Society 
Lake Benton Area Historical Society

Lyon County
Lyon County Historical Society
Cottonwood Area Historical Society

Mahnomen County
Mahnomen County Historical Society

Marshall County
Marshall County Historical Society
Argyle Historical Society
Rosebank Historical Association

Martin County
Martin County Historical Society
Ceylon Area Historical Society
Granada Historical Society
Sherburn Area Historical Society
Trimont Area Historical Society
Truman Historical Association
Welcome Historical Society

McLeod County
Mcleod County Historical Society
Stewart Area Historical Society

Meeker County
Meeker County Historical Society
Dassel Area Historical Society
Grove City Area Historical Society

Mille Lacs County
Mille Lacs County Historical Society
Mille Lacs Lake Historical Society
Milaca Area Historical Society

Morrison County
Morrison County Historical Society
Military Historical Society Of Minnesota
Motley Area Historical Society
Royalton Historical Society
Upsala Area Historical Society

Mower County
Mower County Historical Society
Adams Area Historical Society

Murray County
Murray County Historical Society
Fulda Heritage Society

Nicollet County
Nicollet County Historical Society

Nobles County
Nobles County Historical Society

Norman County
Norman County Historical and Genealogy Society
Red River History Museum

Olmsted County
Olmsted County Historical Society
Oronoco Area History Center
Stewartville Area Historical Society

Otter Tail County
Otter Tail County Historical Society
History Museum Of East Otter Tail County, Minnesota

Pennington County
Pennington County Historical Society
Goodridge Area Historical Society

Pine County
Pine County Historical Society
Pine City Area History Association

Pipestone County
Pipestone County Historical Society
Jasper Historical Society

Polk County
Polk County Historical Society
East Polk Heritage Center
Sand Hill Settlement Historical Society

Pope County
Pope County Historical Society

Ramsey County
Ramsey County Historical Society
Hill Farm Historical Society
Little Canada Historical Society
Maplewood Area Historical Society
New Brighton Area Historical Society
North St. Paul Historical Society
Roseville Historical Society
Shoreview Historical Society
St. Paul Police Historical Society
White Bear Lake Area Historical Society

Red Lake County
Red Lake County Historical Society

Redwood County
Redwood County Historical Society
Lamberton Area Historical Society
Lucan Historical Society Depot Museum

Renville County
Renville County Historical Society
Bechyn Historical Society
Danube Historical Society
Hector Historical Center
Sacred Heart Area Historical Society

ice County
Rice County Historical Society
Morristown Historical Society
Northfield Historical Society

Rock County
Rock County Historical Society

Roseau County
Roseau County Historical Society
Warroad Historical Society

Saint Louis County
St. Louis County Historical Society
Britt Community Historical Society
Canosia Historical Society
Ely-Winton Historical Society
Hermantown Historical Society
Hibbing Historical Society
Iron Range Historical Society
Proctor Area Historical Society
Tower-Soudan Historical Society
Virginia Area Historical Society

Scott County
Scott County Historical Society
Belle Plaine Historical Society
Dan Patch Historical Society
Jordan Area Historical Society
Lydia Area Historical Society
New Prague Historical Society
Shakopee Heritage Society

Sherburne County
Sherburne County Historical Society

Sibley County
Sibley County Historical Society
Arlington Historical Society
Joseph R. Brown Heritage Society
Winthrop Community Historical Society

Stearns County
Albany Heritage Society
Cold Spring Area Historical Society
Kimball Area Historical Society
Melrose Area Historical Society
Paynesville Historical Society
St. Joseph Area Historical Society
Sartell Historical Society
Sauk Centre Area Historical Society

Steele County
Steele County Historical Society

Stevens County
Stevens County Historical Society

Swift County
Swift County Historical Society

Todd County
Todd County Historical Museum
Bertha Historical Society
Eagle Bend Historical Society
Hewitt Historical Society
Staples Historical Society

Traverse County
Traverse County Historical Society
Browns Valley Historical Society

Wabasha County
Wabasha County Historical Society
Lake City Historical Society
Plainview Area History Center

Wadena County, Minnesota
Wadena County Historical Society
Menahga Area Historical Society And Museum
Sebeka Finnish Historical Society
Verndale Historical Society

Waseca County
Waseca County Historical Society

Washington County
Washington County Historical Society
Afton Historical Society
Denmark Township Historical Society 
Marine Historical Society
South Washington Heritage Society
Woodbury Heritage Society

Watonwan County
Watonwan County Historical Society
St. James Historical Society

Wilkin County
Wilkin County Historical Society

Winona County
Winona County Historical Society
Minnesota City Historical Association

Wright County
Wright County Historical Society
Cokato Historical Society
Delano/Franklin Township Historical Society
Hanover Historical Society
Rockford Area Historical Society
St. Michael Historical Society

Yellow Medicine County
Yellow Medicine County Historical Society
Granite Falls Historical Society

Statewide/Topical 
American Swedish Institute
Danish-American Center
Germanic American Institute
Great Northern Railway Historical Society
Heritage Organization of Romanian Americans in Minnesota
Hmong Archives
Jewish Historical Society of the Upper Midwest
Minnesota African American Heritage Museum and Gallery
Minnesota Supreme Court Historical Society
Minnesota Masonic Heritage Center
Norwegian-American Historical Association
Polish Cultural Institute and Museum

Missouri 
Saint Charles County Historical County
Monroe County Historical County
Boone County Historical Society

Nebraska 
 Douglas County Historical Society
 Landmarks Heritage Preservation Commission, Omaha
 Plains Historical Society and Museum, Kimball
 Washington County Historical Society

New Hampshire 
 Manchester Historic Association
 Nottingham Historical Society

New Jersey

New Mexico 
Albuquerque Historical Society
Los Alamos Historical Society
Historical Society for Southeast New Mexico - Roswell
San Juan County Historical Society - San Juan County

New York

North Carolina 
 Chapel Hill Historical Society
 Moore County Historical Association
 Friends of the Page-Walker Hotel, Cary
 The Historical Society of North Carolina, Chapel Hill
 [www.tryonhistoricalmuseum.com], Tryon, NC
 , Polk County, NC
 Wake Forest Historical Museum

Ohio 

Adams County Historical Society
Allen County Historical Society
Amelia Area Historical Society
Ashland County Historical Society & Museum
Ashtabula County Historical Society
Bainbridge Historical Society
Belden Historical Society
Berea Historical Society
Brimfield Historical Society & Kelso House Museum
Broadview Heights Historical Society
Botkins Historical Society
Brookville Historical Society, Inc.
Brown County Historical Society
Brunswick Historical Society
Butler County Historical Society
Catholic Record Society
Centerville-washington Township Historical Society
Chatham Township Historical Society
Cincinnati Historical Society
Clinton County Genealogical & Historical Society
Conneaut Area Historical Society
County Line Historical Society of Wayne-Holmes County
Crestline Historical Society
Delaware County Historical & Genealogical Society
Firelands Historical Society
Fostoria Area Historical Society & Museum
Franklinton Historical Society
Fredericktown Historical Society
Fulton County Historical Society
Gallia County Historical & genealogical Society
Granger Historical Society
Great Lakes Historical Society
Greenfield Historical Society
Greenhills Historical Society
Henry County Historical Society
Highland County Historical Society
Hinckley Historical Society
Historic New Richmond Historical Society
Historical Society of Old Brooklyn
Hudson Historical Society
Huron County Historical Society
Huron Historical Society
International Internet Tech
Jefferson County Historical Association
Jefferson County Historical Society
Kelleys Island Historical Association
Knox County Historical Society
Lake County Historical Society
Lake Erie Historical Society
Lakewood Historical Society
Lake Township Historical Society
Licking County Historical Society
Litchfield Historical Society
Lodi Historical Society
Logan County Historical Society
Lorain County Historical Society
Lucasville Area Historical Society
Madison Historical Society
Mahoning Valley Historical Society
Manchester Historical Society
Mantua Historical Society
Marion County Historical Society
Mason Historical Society
Maumee Valley Historical Society
Medina County Historical Society
Meigs County Historical Society
Miami County Historical & Genealogical Society
Milan Historical Society
Noble County Historical Society
North Baltimore Ohio Area Historical Society
North Ridgeville Historical Society
Oakwood Historical Society
Old Northwest Historical Society
Pemberville-freedom Area Historical Society
Perry County Historical Society
Perry Historical Society Of Lake County
Plain City Historical Society
Plymouth Area Historical Society
Portage County Historical Society
Preble County Historical Society
Richfield Historical Society
Riverside Historical Society and Museum
Rocky River Historical Society
Roseville Historical Society
Ross County Historical Society
Scioto County Historical Society
Scioto Historical Society
Seville Historical Society
Sharon Heritage Society
Shelby County Historical Society
Smithville Community Historical Society
Society of Historic Sharonville
Spencerville Historical Society
Stow Historical Society
Summit County Historical Society
Tippecanoe Historical Society
Trotwood-Madison Historical Society
Troy Historical Society
Trumbull County Historical Society
Twinsburg Historical Society
Upper Sandusky Historical Society
Valley City Historical Society
Van Wert County Historical Society
Vinton County Historical & Genealogical Society
Warren County Historical Society
Washington County Historical Society
Waterville Historical Society
Waynesville Historical Society
Western Reserve Historical Society
Westerville Historical Society
Westfield Historical Society
Williams County Historical Society
Windsor Historical Society
York Township Historical Society

Oklahoma 
Oklahoma City/County Historical Society
Tulsa Historical Society

Oregon

Pennsylvania 
Adams County Historical Society
Blairsville Historical Society
Catholic Historical Society of Western Pennsylvania
Chadds Ford Historical Society
Chester County Historical Society
Cumberland County Historical Society
Delaware County Historical Society
Germantown Historical Society
Greene County Historical Society
Historical and Genealogical Society of Indiana County
Historical Society of Berks County
Historical Society of Frankford
Historical Society of Western Pennsylvania
Hummelstown Historical Society
 Lancaster Mennonite Historical Society
Lawrence County Historical Society
Lehigh County Historical Society
Manheim Historical Society
 Mercer County Historical Society
 Muncy Historical Society
 New Holland Area Historical Society
 Northumberland County Historical Society
Radnor Historical Society
 Sharon Heritage Society
Sharpsville Area Historical Society
 Warren County Historical Society

Rhode Island 
Newport Historical Society
Preservation Society of Newport County
 Tiverton Historical Society

South Carolina 
Beech Island Historical Society
Historic Charleston Foundation
Parris Island Historical and Museum Society
Preservation Society of Charleston
South Carolina Historical Society

Tennessee 
East Tennessee Historical Society

Texas 
Anna Area Historical Preservation Society
East Texas Historical Association
West Texas Historical Association
Texas Jewish Historical Society

Utah
Alta Historical Society
Cache Valley Historical Society
Delta County Historical Society
Draper Utah Historical Society
Fort Harmony Historical Society
Iron County Historical Society
Lehi Historical Society and Archives
Morgan County Historical Society
Park City Historical Society
Riverton Historical Society
Smithfield Historical Society
Summit County Historical Society
Tooele County Historical Society
Washington County Historical Society
West Jordan Historical Society
West Valley Historical Society

Virginia 
Albemarle Charlottesville Historical Society
Alleghany County Historical Society
Augusta County Historical Society
Cape Charles Historical Society
C&O Historical Society
Colonial Williamsburg
Eastern Shore of Virginia Historical Society
Loudoun County Preservation Society
Orange County Historical Society

Washington

Wisconsin

Adams County Historical Society
Albany Historical Society
Albion Academy Historical Society
Alma Historical Society
Almond Historical Society
Altoona Historical Society
Amberg Historical Society
Amery Area Historical Society
Appleton Historical Society
Arcadia Area Historical Society
Ashland Historical Society
Ashwaubenon Historical Society
Badger Historical Society
Badger History Group
Baileys Harbor Historical Society
Baldwin Historical Society
Bangor and Area Historical Society
Bark River Woods Historical Society
Barron County Historical Society
Bay View Historical Society
Bayfield County Historical Society
Bayfield Heritage Association
Beloit Historical Society
Berlin Historical Society
Birchwood Area Historical Society
Black Earth Historical Society
Blanchardville Historical Society
Bloomer Historical Society
Blue Mounds Area Historical Society
Bonduel Community Archives
Boscobel Historical Society
Boulder Junction Area Historical Society
Bowler Area Historical Society
Brandon Historical Society
Brillion Historical Society
Bristol Wisconsin Historical Society
Brodhead Historical Society
Brooklyn Area Historical Society
Brown County Historical Society
Brown Deer Historical Society
Bruce Area Historical Society
Buffalo City-Cochrane Area Historical Society
Buffalo County Historical Society
Burlington Historical Society
Burnett County Historical Society
Byron Historical Society
Cable/Namakagon Area Historical Society
Cadott Area Historical Society
Caledonia Historical Society
Calumet and Cross Heritage Society
Calumet County Historical Society
Cambria-Friesland Historical Society
Cassville Historical Society
Cedarburg Cultural Center
Centreville Settlement
Cheyenne Settlers Heritage Society
Chippewa County Historical Society
Clark County Historical Society
Clinton Community Historical Society
Clintonville Area Historical Society
Coloma Area Historical Society
Columbia County Historical Society
Columbus Area Historical Society
Concord Historical Society
Cottage Grove Area Historical Society
Crawford County Historical Society
Crivitz-Stephenson Historical Society
Cross Plains-Berry Historical Society
Cudahy Historical Society
Dane County Historical Society
Dartford Historical Society
De Pere Historical Society
DeForest Area Historical Society
Delavan Historical Society
Dells Country Historical Society
Dodge Centre Historical Society
Dodge County Historical Society
Door County Historical Society
Dorchester Area Historical Society
Douglas County Historical Society
Dr. Kate Newcomb Museum, Woodruff Historical Society & Library
Dunn County Historical Society
Eagle Historical Society
Eagle River Historical Society
East Troy Area Historical Society
Egg Harbor Historical Society
Eileen Area Historical Society
Eland Area Historical Society
Elmbrook Historical Society
Elroy Area Historical Society
Endeavor Historical Society
Erin Historical Society
Evansville Grove Society
Fairchild Area Historical Society
Fairwater Historical Society
Fall Creek Historical Society
Farmington Historical Society
Fitchburg Historical Society
Florence County Historical Society
Fond du Lac County Historical Society
Forest County Historical and Genealogical Society
Forest History Association of Wisconsin
Fort Atkinson Historical Society
Fountain City Area Historical Society
Fox Lake Historical Museum
Franklin Historical Society
Frederic Area Historical Society
Freedom Area Historical Society
Fremont Area Historical Society
Friendship Rural School Historical Society
Genesee Heritage Society
German Settlement Heritage Society
Germantown Historical Society
Gibraltar Historical Association
Gillett Area Historical Society
Gilman Area Historical Society
Glenwood Area Historical Society
Goodman Historical Society
Gordon-Wascott Historical Society
Grant County Historical Society
Grantsburg Area Historical Society
Greater Matoon Area Historical Society
Green County Genealogical Society
Green County Historical Society
Greendale Historical Society
Greenfield Historical Society
Haese Memorial Village Historical Society
Hales Corners Historical Society
Harrisburg-Troy Historical Society
Hartford Historical Society
Hawks Inn Historical Society
Highland Area Historical Society
Hillsboro Area Historical Society
Historic Allouez Society
Historic Blooming Grove Historical Society
Historical Society of the Upper Baraboo Valley
Historical Society of Walworth & Big Foot Prairie
Holmen Area Historical Society
Horicon Historical Society
Hortonville Historical Society
Howard-Suamico Historical Society
Hustisford Historical Society
Hyde Historical Territory
Iola Historical Society
Iowa County Historical Society
Iron County Historical Society
Jackson County Historical Society
Jackson Historical Society
Jacksonport Historical Society
Jefferson Historical Society
Johnson Creek Historical Society
Jump River Valley Historical Society
Juneau County Historical Society
Kaukauna Area Historical Society
Kekoskee/Williamstown Historical Society
Kenosha County Historical Society
Kewaskum Historical Society
Kewaunee County Historical Society
Kiel Area Historical Society
Knox Creek Heritage Center
Koshkonong Prairie Historical Society
La Crosse County Historical Society
Lac du Flambeau Historical & Cultural Society
Lafayette County Historical Society
Lake Mills-Aztalan Historical Society
Lake States Railway Historical Assn.
Lake Tomahawk Historical Society
Land O'Lakes Historical Society
Langlade County Historical Society
Laura Ingalls Wilder Memorial Society
Lebanon Historical Society
Liberty Grove Historical Society
Linden Historical Society
Little Chute Historical Society
Lodi Valley Historical Society
Lomira Historical Society
Lost Lake-Randolph Historical Society
Loyal Area Historical Society
Luck Area Historical Society
Luther Valley Historical Society
Luxembourg American Cultural Society
Manitowish Waters Historical Society 
Manitowoc County Historical Society
Marathon County Historical Society
Marinette County Historical Society
Marion Area Historical Society
Markesan Historical Society
Marquette County Historical Society
Marquette Historical Society
Marshall Area Historical Society
Mason Area Historical Society
Mayville Historical Society
Mazomanie Historical Society
McFarland Historical Society
Mellen Area Historical Society
Menasha Historical Society
Menomonee Falls Historical Society
Mequon Thiensville Historical Society
Mercer Area Historical Society
Merrill Historical Society
Mid-Continent Railway Historical Society
Middleton Area Historical Society
Millston Historical Society
Milton Historical Society
Milwaukee County Historical Society
Milwaukee Schools Historical Society
Mineral Point Historical Society
Mondovi Area Historical Society
Monroe County Historical Society
Monticello Area Historical Society
Moquah Heritage Society
Mosinee Area Historical Society
Mount Horeb Area Historical Society
Mountain Historical Society
Mukwonago Historical Society
Muskego Historical Society
Neenah Historical Society
New Berlin Historical Society
New Glarus Historical Society
New Holstein Historical Society
New London Heritage Historical Society
Niagara Area Historical Society
Nichols Area Historical Society
Norskedalen Nature & Heritage Center
North Prairie Historical Society
North Wood County Historical Society
Norway Historical Society
Oak Creek Historical Society
Oakfield Area Historical Society
Oconomowoc Historical Society
Oconto County Historical Society
Old Franklin Township Historical Society
Old-Brule Heritage Society
Omro Area Historical Society
Onalaska Area Historical Society
Oregon Area Historical Society
Osceola Historical Society
Osseo Historical Society
Oulu Historical Society
Outagamie County Historical Society
Ozaukee County Historical Society
Palmyra Historical Society
Pepin County Historical Society
Peshtigo Historical Society
Pewaukee Area Historical Society
Pierce County Historical Association
Pittsville Area Historical Society
Pleasant Prairie Historical Society
Plymouth Historical Society
Polk County Historical Society
Port Washington Historical Society
Portage County Historical Society
Portage Historical Society
Poynette Area Historical Society
Prairie du Chien Historical Society
Presque Isle Heritage Society
Price County Historical Society
Princeton Historical Society
Pulaski Area Historical Society
Random Lake Area Historical Society
Reedsburg Area Historical Society
Rhinelander Historical Society
Richfield Historical Society
Richland County Historical Society
Rio Area Historical Society
Ripon Historical Society
Rochester Area Historical Society
Rock County Historical Society
Rock River Thresheree
Rosendale Historical Society
Rural Historical Society
Rusk County Historical Society
Sauk County Historical Society
Sauk Prairie Area Historical Society
Saukville Area Historical Society
Sawyer County Historical Society
Seymour Community Historical Society
Shawano County Historical Society
Sheboygan County Historical Research Center
Sheboygan County Historical Society
Shorewood Historical Society
Sister Bay Historical Society
Solon Springs Historical Society
South Milwaukee Historical Society
South Wood County Historical Corporation
St. Croix County Historical Society
St. Croix Falls Historical Society
St. Francis Historical Society
St. Nazianz Area Historical Society
Stanley Area Historical Society
Sterling Eureka Laketown Historical Society
Sterling North Society, Ltd.
Stone Lake Area Historical Society
Stoughton Historical Society
Stratford Area Historical Society
Suring Area Historical Society
Sussex-Lisbon Area Historical Society
Taylor County Historical Society
Theodore Robinson Society
Theresa Historical Society
Thorp Area Historical Society
Three Lakes Historical Society
Tigerton Area Historical Society
Tomah Area Historical Society
Tomahawk Area Historical Society
Tomorrow River Valley Historical Society
Town 25 North Historical Society
Town of Kaukauna Historical Society
Town of Sullivan Historical Society
Trempealeau Community Heritage Society
Trempealeau County Historical Society
Two Rivers Historical Society
Venerable Fire Collection
Vermont Essex County - Island Pond Historical Society - https://www.islandpondhistoricalsociety.com
Vermont Essex County - Norton Historical Society - https://nortonhistoricalsociety.info
Vernon County Historical Society
Verona Area Historical Society
Vilas County Museum & Historical Society
Waldemar Ager Association
Walworth County Historical Society
Washburn Area Historical Society
Washburn County Historical Society
Washington County Historical Society
Waterloo Area Historical Society
Watertown Historical Society
Waukesha County Historical Society & Museum
Waukesha Engine Historical Society
Waupaca Historical Society
Waupun Historical Society
Waushara County Historical Society
Wauwatosa Historical Society
West Allis Historical Society
West Milwaukee Historical Society
West Salem Historical Society
Westby Area Historical Society
Western Bayfield County Historical Society
Western Kenosha County Historical Society
Weyauwega Area Historical Society
White Lake Area Historical Society
Whitefish Bay Historical Society
Whitewater Historical Society
Wild Rose Historical Society
Willard Historical Society
Williams Bay Historical Society
Winchester Area Historical Society
Winnebago County Historical and Archeological Society
Winneconne Historical Society
Wisconsin Black Historical Society & Museum
Wisconsin Chapter-National Railway Historical Society
Wisconsin Chapter-Society of Automotive Historians
Wisconsin Freewill Baptist Historical Society
Wisconsin Labor History Society
Wisconsin Marine Historical Society
Wisconsin Postal Historical Society
Wisconsin Pottery Association
Wisconsin Slovak Historical Society
Wisconsin State Genealogical Society
Wittenberg Area Historical Society
Woodville Historical Society Museum
Wrightstown Historical Society

Aviation historical societies

United States 
Aircraft Engine Historical Society, Huntsville, Alabama
American Aviation Historical Society, Santa Ana, California
B-26 Marauder Historical Society, at Pima Air and Space Museum, Tucson, Arizona
Colorado Aviation Historical Society, Denver, Colorado
Cortez Aviation Heritage Society, Cortez, Colorado
Pueblo Historical Aircraft Society, Pueblo, Colorado
Florida Aviation Historical Society
Hawaii Aviation Preservation Society
Maine Aviation Historical Society
Massachusetts Aviation Historical Society
Missouri Aviation Historical Society, St. Louis, Missouri
New Hampshire Aviation Historical Society
Oregon Aviation Historical Society
United States Airways Heritage Association

Other countries 
Air-Britain, United Kingdom
Aviation Historical Society of Australia, Australia
Aviation Historical Society of New Zealand, New Zealand
Tramway Historical Society New Zealand
Aviation Historical Society of the Northern Territory, Canada
Bod? Aviation Historical Society, Norway
Canadian Aviation Historical Society, Canada
Ontario Aviation Historical Society, Canada
Aviation Archaeology in Greece, Greece
European Aviation Historical Society
Historical Aviation Society of Ireland, Ireland
Civil Aviation Historical Society, Australia (Air Services Australia)
Swedish Aviation Historical Society, Sweden
Ulster Aviation Society, Northern Ireland
West Beach Aviation Group, Australia
Instituto de Historia y Cultura Aeronáuticas, Spain

Denominational societies 
 American Baptist Historical Society
 Baptist History and Heritage Society
 Disciples of Christ Historical Society
 Evangelical & Reformed Historical Society (German Reformed Church)
 Historical Society of the Episcopal Church
 Lutheran Historical Society of the Mid-Atlantic
 National Episcopal Historians and Archivists
 Presbyterian Historical Society

Time-period oriented societies

United States 
American Antiquarian Society

The Historical Society
Medieval Academy of America
Plymouth Antiquarian Society

Subject matter-based historical societies

Canada 
Canadian Society for the History of Medicine
Miles Canyon Historical Society
Photographic Historical Society of Canada

India 
Kokborok tei Hukumu Mission

United Kingdom 
Historical Diving Society
Historical Maritime Society
Jewish Historical Society of England
Plastics Historical Society
Nautical Archaeology Society
Railway and Canal Historical Society

United States 
Anthracite Railroads Historical Society
Conrail Historical Society
Cotton Belt Rail Historical Society
Filipino American National Historical Society
Great Northern Railway Historical Society
John Shaw Billings History of Medicine Society
MCRD Museum Historical Society
National Railway Historical Society
North Jersey Electric Railway Historical Society
Polish Historical Society (United States)
The Pennsylvania-Reading Seashore Lines Historical Society
Theatre Historical Society of America
Ulster & Delaware Railroad Historical Society
United Railroad Historical Society of New Jersey

See also 

List of genealogical societies
List of Antiquarian Societies
List of halls and walks of fame
List of Royal Societies
Text publication society

References

Further reading
 Boyd, Julian P. "State and local historical societies in the United States." The American Historical Review 40.1 (1934): 10-37.
 Dunlap, Leslie W. American historical societies, 1790-1860 (1944).
 Jones, Houston Gwynne, ed. Historical Consciousness in the Early Republic: The Origins of State Historical Societies, Museums, and Collections, 1791-1861 (North Caroliniana Society and North Carolina Collection, 1995)
 Schumacher, Ryan. "The Wisconsin Magazine of History: A Case Study in Scholarly and Popular Approaches to American State Historical Society Publishing, 1917–2000." Journal of Scholarly Publishing 44.2 (2013): 114-141.
 Whitehill, Walter Muir. Independent historical societies: an enquiry into their research and publication functions and their financial future (Harvard Univ Pr, 1962)

 
Societies